Wansford may refer to the following places in England:

Wansford, Cambridgeshire
Wansford railway station, headquarters of the Nene Valley Railway
Wansford, East Riding of Yorkshire